Ostaszów  is a village in the administrative district of Gmina Przemków, within Polkowice County, Lower Silesian Voivodeship, in south-western Poland.

Prior to 1945 it was in Germany. It had been erected from 1936 as a model village by workers of the Reichsarbeitsdienst and named after Nazi official Konstantin Hierl.

The village has a population of 283.

References

Villages in Polkowice County